The (n-p) reaction, or (n,p) reaction, is an example of a nuclear reaction. It is the reaction which occurs when a neutron enters a nucleus and a proton leaves the nucleus simultaneously.

For example, sulfur-32 (32S) undergoes an (n,p) nuclear reaction when bombarded with neutrons, thus forming phosphorus-32 (32P).

The nuclide nitrogen-14 (14N) can also undergo an (n,p) nuclear reaction to produce carbon-14 (14C). This nuclear reaction 14N (n,p) 14C continually happens in the Earth's atmosphere, forming equilibrium amounts of the radionuclide 14C.

Most (n,p) reactions have threshold neutron energies below which the reaction cannot take place as a result of the charged particle in the exit channel requiring energy (usually more than a MeV) to overcome the Coulomb barrier experienced by the emitted proton. The (n,p) nuclear reaction 14N (n,p) 14C is an exception to this rule, and is exothermic – it can take place at all incident neutron energies. The 14N (n,p) 14C nuclear reaction is responsible for most of the radiation dose delivered to the human body by thermal neutrons – these thermal neutrons are absorbed by the nitrogen 14N in proteins, causing a proton to be emitted; the emitted proton deposits its kinetic energy over a very short distance in the body tissue, thereby depositing radiation dose.

References

Nucleosynthesis